These lists give the states of Australian prime ministers by the locations of the divisions which they represented, and by their birthplaces.

States of represented division

By order of first term

By state

Per state

Birth places
Twelve prime ministers, those born prior to the federation of Australia, were born in British colonies within Australia, rather than independent Australian states. The birthplaces of seven prime ministers are decisively within sovereign states that are separate from Australia, including six in Great Britain, and one in Chile.

The number of prime ministers born per state are:
 One: South Australia and Tasmania.
 Three: Queensland.
 Nine: Victoria.
 Ten: New South Wales 
States and territories that have not born a prime minister: Australian Capital Territory, Northern Territory, Western Australia.

By state

Prime ministers with division outside of birth state
Of the 24 Australian-born individuals who have been prime ministers of Australia, four became so after representing  divisions in different states than the ones in which they were born.

Maps

Countries

Cities

See also
 Prime Minister of Australia
 List of prime ministers of Australia by time in office
 List of prime ministers of Australia by military service

References

Notes

State
Prime ministers of Australia
Lists of prime ministers by place of birth